Frederik Jakobsen (born 1 May 1998) is a motorcycle speedway rider from Denmark.

Career
In 2018, Jakobsen rode in the top tier of British Speedway, riding for the Poole Pirates in the SGB Premiership 2018. He was a finalist in the 2018 and 2019 Individual Speedway Junior World Championship.

In 2022, he returned to the British league when riding for the King's Lynn Stars in the SGB Premiership 2022. In 2023, he re-signed for King's Lynn for the SGB Premiership 2023 and for GKM Grudziądz for the 2023 Polish speedway season.

Personal life
His father Jan Jakobsen rode for Cradley Heath in 1987.

References 

1998 births
Living people
Danish speedway riders
King's Lynn Stars riders
Poole Pirates riders